Đỗ Nhuận (December 10, 1922 in Hải Dương – May 18, 1991 in Hà Nội) was a Vietnamese classical composer. He is known for the first homegrown Vietnamese opera - Cô Sao "Miss Sao." This and other more-or-less revolutionary themed musicals were premiered by the Vietnam National Opera and Ballet (VNOB) at the Grand Opera House. In 1996, he  was posthumously awarded the Hồ Chí Minh Prize for music.

Don't confuse with an earlier Đỗ Nhuận (born 1440), a high ranking politician, a notable poet, member of  - a famous association of 28 poets under the command of King Lê Thánh Tông.

Early years
Unlike most of the musicians at that time who followed the romantic orientation, Đỗ Nhuận entered the music industry with patriotic songs. In 1939, at the age of 17, he had his first work Trưng Vương (Trưng sisters). During 1940 – 1941, he focused on completing the opera Nguyễn Trãi – Phi Khanh (Nguyễn Trãi and his father) and many other compositions. His works performed have awakened the patriotism of Vietnamese people. Because of those songs and other activities assigned by the Việt Minh front, such as printing and distributing propaganda leaflets for the revolution, mobilizing students and young people to respond to movements, he became a key cadre of the Việt Minh among Hải Phòng youth and students.

In the second Indochina War
Đỗ Nhuận is also the only musician in the first generation of Vietnamese neo-musicians who is well-trained (others mostly self-taught). He studied at the Tchaikovsky Conservatory from 1960 to 1963.

During the late 1960s he was highly critical of the "pop" music of songwriters in the South such as Phạm Duy. Đỗ Nhuận was the General Secretary of the Vietnam Musicians' Association in two continuous terms (1957-1963, and 1963-1983).

Works
Operas
 Cô Sao ("Miss Sao") Hanoi 1965, restaged as A Sao 1976.
 Người tạc tượng ("The Sculptor") Hanoi 1971
 Nguyễn Trãi ("life of Nguyễn Trãi") Hanoi 1980.

Songs
 Du kích ca ("Guerrilla song") 1945.
 Du kích Sông Thao ("Guerrillas of Thao River") - composed in 1949, a typical song of Nhạc đỏ, performed by many famous singers, one of them is Đào Tố Loan in Toyota Concert 2017.
 Hành quân xa ("Far marching") 1954.
 Giải phóng Điện Biên ("Liberate Điện Biên") - composed on May 7, 1954, day of Điện Biên Phủ victory, was chosen as one of the official daily theme tunes of the Voice of Vietnam.
 Việt Nam - Trung Hoa ("越南—中华, Vietnam - China") - 1966
 Hát mừng các cụ dân quân ("Congratulation to the elderly militiamen") 1969 - song about the elderly militiamen who shot two planes of United States Navy down in Operation Rolling Thunder

References 

People from Hải Dương province
Vietnamese composers
1922 births
1991 deaths
Ho Chi Minh Prize recipients
20th-century composers